Christina Sade Olumeko (born 26 November 1996) is a Danish politician and member of the Folketing, the national legislature. A member of The Alternative party, she has represented Copenhagen since November 2022.

Olumeko was born on 26 November 1996. Her mother is French and her father is Nigerian. She has a bachelor's degree in political science from the University of Copenhagen (2019). She was a student assistant, analysis consultant and financial consultant at various schools from 2018 to 2022. She was a member of Copenhagen City Council from 2021 to 2022.

References

External links

1996 births
21st-century Danish women politicians
Copenhagen City Council members
Living people
Members of the Folketing 2022–2026
The Alternative (Denmark) politicians
University of Copenhagen alumni
Women members of the Folketing